Iain Finlayson (born 1945) is a Scottish writer and journalist.

Finlayson has written biographies of James Boswell and Robert Browning, as well as books about Romney Marsh, the Scots, denim and Tangier.

He was books editor of Saga Magazine, and reviewed books for The Times.

Under the collective pseudonym Matthew McAllister, he and Simon Burt have written a crime novel, Blood Month, published electronically under their imprint Atrium Editions.

Iain Finlayson lives & works in Hay-on-Wye, Wales.

Works
 Winston Churchill, 1980
 The moth and the candle: a life of James Boswell, 1984
 The sixth continent: a literary history of Romney Marsh, 1986
 The Scots: a portrait of the Scottish soul at home and abroad, 1987
 Denim: an American legend, 1990
 Tangier: city of the dream, 1992
 Browning: a private life, 2003
 (with Simon Burt, as Matthew McAllister) Blood Month, 2012

References

External links
 atriumeditions.co.uk

1945 births
Living people
Scottish journalists
Scottish biographers
Scottish crime writers
20th-century biographers
21st-century biographers